Michael Russell was the defending champion, but retired against Tennys Sandgren in the quarterfinals.
Top seed Tim Smyczek won the title defeating unseeded Canadian Peter Polansky in the final.

Seeds

Draw

Finals

Top half

Bottom half

References
 Main Draw
 Qualifying Draw

Knoxville Challenger - Singles
2013 Singles